Argyrotaenia interfasciae is a species of moth of the family Tortricidae. It is found in Peru.

The wingspan is about 13 mm. The ground colour of the forewings is cream, slightly tinged with ochreous before the middle and darker in the posterior parts of the wing. The forewings are dotted and strigulated (finely streaked) with brownish and there are olive brown dark markings. The hindwings are dark brown.

Etymology
The species name refers to the interfascia of the forewings, which strongly differ from the remaining fascia.

References

Moths described in 2010
interfasciae
Moths of South America